The Harambe Entrepreneur Alliance is a US-based business network for African entrepreneurs that provides funding, university scholarships and a support ecosystem. The Alliance was founded by Okendo Lewis-Gayle and is supported by Cisco and the Oppenheimer Generations Foundation, amongst others. Members of the Harambe Alliance have raised over $500 million from Google Ventures, the Chan Zuckerberg Initiative and Alibaba to support their ventures.

Partnerships 
The Alliance is supported by and is partnered with:

 Cisco Systems
 Oppenheimer Generations Foundation
 The IDP Foundation
 The Fletcher School of Law and Diplomacy
 Yale School of Management
 Saïd Business School

Notable Members 

 Eyram Tawia, founder of Leti Arts
 Iyinoluwa Aboyeji, former MD of Flutterwave and co-founder of Andela
 Lungisa Matshoba, CTO of Yoco
 Kelechi Ofoegbu, COO of Impact Hub Accra
 Adeteyo Bamiduro of Max.ng

References 

Venture capital

Investment funds
International development in Africa